Edward Ashley Ives (born January 3, 1961 in Mount Kisco, New York) is a former American competitive rower and Olympic silver medalist.  He represented the United States at the 1984 Summer Olympics in Los Angeles, where he received a silver medal in the men's coxed fours competition with Thomas Kiefer, Michael Bach, Gregory Springer, and John Stillings. Four years later, at the 1988 Summer Olympics, he finished in 9th place in the men's coxless pairs.

References

External links
 
 

1961 births
Living people
Rowers at the 1984 Summer Olympics
Rowers at the 1988 Summer Olympics
Olympic silver medalists for the United States in rowing
American male rowers
World Rowing Championships medalists for the United States
Medalists at the 1984 Summer Olympics
Pan American Games gold medalists for the United States
Pan American Games medalists in rowing
Rowers at the 1987 Pan American Games
Goodwill Games medalists in rowing
Competitors at the 1986 Goodwill Games
Medalists at the 1987 Pan American Games